RTV Zenica (RTVZE) or Radio-televizija Zenica is a Bosnian public television channel founded by Assembly of Zenica-Doboj Canton. Local public radio station Radio Zenica is also part of this company. Headquarters of RTV Zenica is located in the City of Zenica. The program is mainly produced in Bosnian language.

RTV Zenica is the regional broadcaster (founded in 1995) that has modern equipment for broadcasting radio and television programs, as well as audio and video production. TV program is currently broadcast 24h at the four frequencies, estimated number of viewers population is about 104.028.  RTVZE is member of the Bosnian television network called TV1Mreža.

Mreža TV is a television program with almost national coverage in Bosnia and Herzegovina, and jointly in partnership with O Kanal broadcast several regional public and private TV stations. Mreža TV airs popular series, movies and sports programs to viewers in BiH.

Current line-up

This television channel broadcasts a variety of programs such as news, talk shows, documentaries, sports, movies, mosaic, children's programs, etc.

 Zenica danas (Zenica Today) – main news programme (every night at 19:00h)
 Vijesti (News) – news at 13:00h and 15:00h
 Iz dana u dan (Day by Day) – an overview of the local service information at 12:00, 14:00 and 17:00h.
 Hronika dana (Chronicle of the day) – an overview of the daily events that prepares the information desk of RTV Zenica
 Ogledalo (Mirror) – talk show (live) about communal issues, politics, education, health, social issues, workers' rights
 Zeničke priče (Zenica stories) – positive stories about people from Zenica
 Selu u pohode (Village Revisited) – stories of past and present, about the life, culture, customs and traditions of people from the countryside.
 Sfera (Sphere) – weekly review of current cultural events in the zenica-Doboj Canton
 Popodne s vama (Afternoon With You) – afternoon  mosaic program
 Odlikaši – Children's school program
 ZE sport – TV chronicle dedicated to local sports news
 Auto shop magazin – TV show dedicated to news from the auto industry
 Nije teško biti ja (It Is Not Hard to Be Me) – entertainment/interview program hosted by Živojin Krstić
 TV Liberty – TV magazine produced by Radio Free Europe/Radio Liberty services for Bosnia and Herzegovina
 Vijesti Glasa Amerike – VOA News in the Bosnian language
 Sport Nedjeljom (Sport on Sundays) – Croatian sport magazine

References

External links
 www.rtvze.ba (Official Website)
 Communications Regulatory Agency of Bosnia and Herzegovina

Television stations in Bosnia and Herzegovina
Television channels and stations established in 1995